Sweep of Days is the second full-length album released by Danish alternative rock group Blue Foundation.  It was released in 2004 by Virgin Denmark.

Track listing
"History" - 0:57
"As I Moved On" - 4:01
"End of the Day (Silence)" - 4:04
"Ricochet" - 6:01
"2:17 AM" - 3:01
"Embers" - 5:27
"Bonfires" - 4:15
"The Yellow Man" - 3:37
"Shine" - 4:47
"Save This Town" - 3:39
"Sweep" - 10:53
"My Day" - 10:00
Includes hidden track.

Personnel
Tobias Wilner a.k.a. Bichi - vocals, producer, guitar
Kirstine Stubbe Teglbjærg a.k.a. Stern - vocals, guitar
Scott Martingell a.k.a. MC Jabber - vocals, spoken word
Tatsuki Oshima - turntable manipulation
Bo Rande - synth, horn, producer
Sune Martin - bass

References

2004 albums
Blue Foundation albums